The Scottish Football Writers' Association Women's International Player of the Year award is given to the player in the Scotland women's national football team who is seen to have made the best contribution to the previous season. The award is given by the Scottish Football Writers' Association (SFWA).

List of winners
A companion to the men's award established in 2008, the women's award was first made in 2022, at that time sponsored by Glen's Vodka. At the ceremony itself on 8 May, several guests left during the dinner in response to sexist jokes by one of the speakers.

An award organised by the Scottish Football Association itself and voted for by supporters was already in place (winners including Weir and Erin Cuthbert), and PFA Scotland also introduced awards for Player and Team of the Year in 2022, in addition to those for the domestic leagues (the SWPL and lower divisions).

Winners by club

References

Scottish football trophies and awards
Awards established in 2022
2022 establishments in Scotland
Scotland women's national football team